The men's tournament of the 2017 FIBA 3x3 Under-18 World Cup was hosted in Chengdu, China in front of the New Century Global Center. It was contested by 20 teams.

Participating teams
The FIBA Zone of the Americas was not represented by at least one country in the continent. The top 20 teams, including the hosts, based on the FIBA National Federation ranking qualified for the tournament as of January 3, 2017.

FIBA Asia (8)
  (7)
  (9)
  (10)
  (11)
  (14)
  (15)
  (18)
  (19)

FIBA Africa (1)
  (20)

FIBA Oceania (1)
  (6)

FIBA Europe (10)
  (1)
  (2)
  (3)
  (4)
  (5)
  (8)
  (12)
  (13)
  (16)
  (17)

Main tournament

Preliminary round

Group A

Group B

Group C

Group D

Knockout stage

Final standings

Individual contests

Dunk contest
Overall format
Each player will be allowed 75 seconds and 3 attempts per round to complete a dunk with the first successful dunk being considered as the valid one. Dunks are graded 0 or 5 to 10 by each member of a jury composing of five people.

Qualification
Format
The qualification round took place on June 30 at 17:25h (GMT+8). Each player competed in two rounds and four players with the highest score advances to the knockout stage. In a case of a tie, the tied players would have to perform again and in case they were still tied, the jury would have to decide the player who will advance through a majority decision.

Knockout stage
The knockout stage consisting of a semi-final and final phase took place on July 2.
Semi-final
The top two players advances to the final round.

Final
The time limit was eliminated for the final and the two players competed for three rounds instead of two.

Results

Awards
Team of the Tournament
  Ayoub Nouhi
  Vincent Peeters
  Samo Gabersek

MVP
  Ayoub Nouhi

References

Men